Relfs Bluff is a populated place in Lincoln County, Arkansas, United States. It is the location of the 1925-built Mt. Zion Presbyterian Church, which is listed on the National Register of Historic Places.

References

Unincorporated communities in Lincoln County, Arkansas
Unincorporated communities in Arkansas